The 2015 Virginia Cavaliers men's soccer team will be the college's 75th season of playing organized men's college soccer, and their 62nd season playing in the Atlantic Coast Conference. The Cavaliers enter the season as the defending national champions.

Schedule 

|-
!colspan=6 style="background:#0d3268; color:#ff7c00;"| England Tour
|-

|-

|-

|-
!colspan=6 style="background:#0d3268; color:#ff7c00;"| Spring Season
|-

|-

|-

|-

|-
!colspan=6 style="background:#0d3268; color:#ff7c00;"| Preseason
|-

|-
!colspan=6 style="background:#0d3268; color:#ff7c00;"| Regular Season
|-

|-

|-

|-

|-

|-

|-

|-

|-

|-

|-

|-

|-

|-

|-

|-

|-
!colspan=6 style="background:#0d3268; color:#ff7c00;"| ACC Tournament
|-
|-

References 

Virginia Cavaliers
Virginia Cavaliers men's soccer seasons
Virginia Cavaliers men's soccer
Virginia Cavaliers